Hoffland or Hovland is a village in Ålesund Municipality in Møre og Romsdal county, Norway.

It is located at the entrance to two undersea tunnels. The Ellingsøy Tunnel leads to the city of Ålesund on the nearby island of Nørvøya and the Valderøy Tunnel leads to the island of Valderøya in neighboring Giske Municipality.

Ole Brunes, a native of Hoffland, was among a group of fishermen of primarily Scandinavian ancestry who in the late 1880s founded the community of Hovland, Minnesota which he named for his Norwegian place of origin. Of similar origin is also the community of Hoffland, Nebraska.

References

Ålesund
Villages in Møre og Romsdal